The Ducati Scrambler was the brand name for a series of single cylinder scrambler motorcycles made by Ducati for the American market from 1962 until 1974. Its creation is attributed to the American Berliner Motor Corporation. Models were produced in 250 cc through 450 cc displacements. The 450 variant was sold as the "Jupiter" in the United States.

The first Scramblers (1962-1967) were derived from street-legal models, and featured "narrow case" engines with lightly altered frames. It originally derived from a Ducati Diana road bike converted by Michael Berliner for dirt-track racing in America. These Scrambler models all had a maximum engine capacity of 250cc, and are generally referred to as "narrow case Scrambler(s)"

Scrambler OHC 250 (1962-1963)
Scrambler 250 (1964-1968)
Scrambler 350 (1967-1968)
The second series used a wider engine case. Frames were modified with experience derived from Bruno Spaggiari's Ducati factory racing motorcycles.

Scrambler 125 (1970-1971)
Scrambler 250 (1968-1975)
Scrambler 350 (1968-1975)
Scrambler 450 (1969-1976)
 R/T 350 (1971-1974)
 R/T 450 (1971-1974) (desmodromic valves)

Revival

The Scrambler name is revived in 2015 as Ducati's modern-classic styled motorcycle.

Further reading

References

External links

1970 Ducati 350 Scrambler, How Stuff Works
1969 Ducati 450 Jupiter: The Bike That Changed My Life, Motorcyclist, September 2012
1962 Original Ducati Scrambler

Scrambler
Standard motorcycles
Motorcycles introduced in 1962